Alysidium may refer to:
 Alysidium (bryozoan), a genus of bryozoas in the family Alysidiidae
 Alysidium (fungus), a genus of fungi in the family Botryobasidiaceae